Joseph Morton (died September 1721) was an early colonist and governor of the Province of Carolina. Although he was not one of Carolina's Lords Proprietors, Morton was influential in the recruitment of religious dissenters to migrate to the new colony. In 1680 he led a group of dissenters to what is now South Carolina, settling Edisto Island. In 1682 he was appointed governor of the colony by the proprietors, but due to disagreements with the proprietors was replaced in 1684. A second appointment in 1686 lasted only one month before he was supplanted by James Colleton. Morton had been in the process of organizing an expedition against Spanish Florida, which the colonists believed was harboring pirates operating against the colony's coastal settlements. Colleton immediately put a stop to the expedition, since England and Spain were then at peace.

In 1697 he was named a judge of the admiralty by King William III. Because of this appointment he was denied a third opportunity to be governor by the proprietors in 1701. He supported education and libraries in the colony. He married into the family of Joseph Blake, who also served as governor of the province. He had two children, and died in September 1721.

References
Leach, Josiah. Memoranda Relating to the ancestry and family of Hon. Levi Parson Morton
McCrady, Edward. The History of South Carolina under the Proprietary Government

1721 deaths
Colonial governors of South Carolina
Date of death missing
Landgraves of Carolina
Year of birth unknown
People from Edisto Island, South Carolina